Adhem may refer to:

Abou Ben Adhem Shrine Mosque
Ibrahim Bin Adham, also known as Abu Ben Adhem, an Arab Muslim saint

See also
Adhemar